Anton Andrejevič Smolski (born 16 December 1996) is a Belarusian biathlete. He competed in the 2018 Winter Olympics.

Biathlon results
All results are sourced from the International Biathlon Union.

Olympic Games
1 medal (1 silver)

World Championships
0 medals

*During Olympic seasons competitions are only held for those events not included in the Olympic program.
**The single mixed relay was added as an event in 2019.

References

1996 births
Living people
Biathletes at the 2018 Winter Olympics
Biathletes at the 2022 Winter Olympics
Belarusian male biathletes
Olympic biathletes of Belarus
Medalists at the 2022 Winter Olympics
Olympic silver medalists for Belarus
Olympic medalists in biathlon
People from Kapyl District
Sportspeople from Minsk Region